Alice in Murderland may refer to:

 Alice in Murderland (manga), a Japanese manga series by Kaori Yuki that began in 2014
 Alice in Murderland (film), a 2010 American horror film